The second season of the American television drama series Empire premiered on September 23, 2015, in the United States on Fox. The season was ordered on January 17, 2015. The show is produced by 20th Century Fox Television, in association with Imagine Entertainment, Lee Daniels Entertainment, Danny Strong Productions and Little Chicken Inc. The showrunners for this season are Ilene Chaiken, Danny Strong and Lee Daniels. The season aired on Wednesday at  9:00 pm, the same slot as the previous season. The season concluded on May 18, 2016, and consisted of 18 episodes.

Premise 
The show centers on a hip hop music and entertainment company, Empire Entertainment, and the drama among the members of the founders' family as they fight for control of the company.

Cast and characters

Main cast
 Taraji P. Henson as Cookie Lyon
 Terrence Howard as Lucious Lyon
 Bryshere Y. Gray as Hakeem Lyon
 Jussie Smollett as Jamal Lyon
 Trai Byers as Andre Lyon
 Grace Gealey as Anika Calhoun
 Kaitlin Doubleday as Rhonda Lyon
 Gabourey Sidibe as Becky Williams
 Ta'Rhonda Jones as Porsha Taylor
 Serayah as Tiana Brown

Recurring cast

Special guest stars

Production

Empire was renewed for a second season on January 17, 2015, by Fox after only two episodes had aired. It was announced to contain 18 episodes, split into two parts, with ten episodes in the fall, and the remaining eight episodes after the Christmas break, beginning in January. Filming began on June 23, 2015, as confirmed by Fox, in addition to Chris Rock being spotted on set.

Casting 
The second season had ten roles receiving star billing, with seven of them returning from the previous season, in addition to three characters upgraded from the first season. Terrence Howard will portray Lucious Lyon, a former drug dealer turned hip hop mogul and the CEO of Empire Entertainment who now is imprisoned. Taraji P. Henson will play Cookie Lyon, Lucious' outspoken ex-wife and mother of his three sons, who served 17 years in prison, and have now made a hostile takeover for Empire Entertainment with Anika, Andre and Hakeem. Lucious and Cookie have three sons: Andre Lyon, the eldest son of the Lyon family and CFO of Empire Entertainment who will be played by Trai Byers, and will deal with his wife killing Uncle Vernon in the previous season finale. Jussie Smollett will play Jamal Lyon, the middle son and "black sheep" of the Lyon family, a talented, gay singer-songwriter who has been given control over Empire from his father, Lucious. Bryshere Y. Gray will portray Hakeem Lyon, the fame-obsessed youngest son and Lucious' favorite child, who is a hip hop star on the rise and has been included in the hostile takeover with his mother, Anika and Andre.

Other series regulars returning are Grace Gealey, who will reprise her character Anika Calhoun, former head of Empire Entertainment A&R and Lucious' ex fiancée who has worked together with Cookie replace the acting board of directors at Empire. Kaitlin Doubleday will play Rhonda Lyon, Andre's power-hungry and money-obsessed wife who must deal with killing Uncle Vernon in order to protect Andre and her pregnancy, as revealed in the season one finale. In addition, Ta'Rhonda Jones, Gabourey Sidibe and Serayah McNeill were upgraded to series regulars after being billed as recurring characters during season one. They will be playing their respective roles as Porsha Taylor, personal assistant to Cookie, Becky Williams, executive assistant to Lucious at Empire Entertainment and Tiana Brown, a R&B-pop artist signed to Empire Entertainment, respectively.

Chris Rock, Lenny Kravitz and Alicia Keys were originally slated to guest star as themselves, but it was later revealed that Rock would play Frank Gathers. Adam Rodriguez will recur as Laz Delgado, a smooth promoter and a potential love interest for Cookie. On June 11, 2015, it was announced that the producers were casting the new breakout role of Betty Barz, a "moody, outspoken" teenage rapper who will first appear in the season premiere. Description of the character was that she was an African-American, "unapologetically butch," and something of a hometown hero in her "Brownsville-Never-Ran-Never-Will, Brooklyn" neighborhood.

On June 26, 2015, it was announced that Tyra Ferrell was cast as a lawyer who will be in contact with the Lyon family. It was announced on July 2, 2015, that Marisa Tomei was cast as Mimi Whiteman, a demanding venture capitalist who becomes embroiled in Lyon family drama. Kelly Rowland was reported on July 6, 2015, to have joined the cast as Lucious Lyon's mother in flashbacks. On July 17, 2015, TVLine reported that Andre Royo will join the cast as Thirsty Rawlings, a sharp lawyer who will defend Lucious. Bryshere Y. Gray was the one to announce that Becky G will join the cast in a guest-starring role in the second season as Valentina. It was announced on July 14, 2015, that Hakeem will have a new love interest whose name is Laura, a serious talented vocalist. 

On August 3, 2015, it was revealed that Adam Busch has signed on for a multi-episode recurring arc, playing Chase One, a sexy, gifted, avant-garde gay artist who's doing a photo shoot, and is infatuated with his male star, while Jamila Velazquez, Raquel Castro and newcomer Yani Marin will play unconfirmed recurring roles. It was announced on August 5, 2015, that Mariah Carey will guest star in one of the upcoming episodes in a top-secret role. One day later, on August 6, 2015, it was also confirmed that Pitbull would appear as himself. Al Sharpton and Andre Leon Talley will appear as themselves, and will appear in the season premiere as they will show their support for the embattled music CEO at an epic, outdoor "Free Lucious" concert. On August 21, it was announced that Mo McRae was cast as J-Poppa, a love interest for Gabourey Sidibe's character Becky, which will appear in three episodes. On September 14, 2015, it was announced Rafael de la Fuente would return portraying the role of Michael in at least four episodes of the season. On November 5, Entertainment Weekly reported that Annie Ilonzeh had been cast in the role of TV reporter Harper Scott and would appear in the second half of the season.

Episodes

Reception

Critical response 
Early reviews for the second season of Empire indicate positive reviews. On the aggregator, Rotten Tomatoes, the season earned a 95% rating based on 39 reviews. It received a 77 out of 100 on the review aggregate website Metacritic based on 22 critics, indicating "generally favorable reviews".

Live + SD ratings

Live + 7 Day (DVR) ratings

References

2015 American television seasons
2016 American television seasons
Empire (2015 TV series) seasons